The Luxgen S5, or previously known as the Luxgen5 Sedan, is a 5-seater compact sedan car produced by the Taiwanese car company Luxgen.

Overview
The model is the first car developed entirely in Taiwan. It was styled by the HAITEC Design Center led by James C. Shyr. It was unveiled in November 2011 as the electric concept car Neora at the Taipei Auto Show, officially launching in the second quarter of 2012. Luxgen5 Sedan is the first sedan of Luxgen series. It has a 1.8-liter turbo charged petrol engine or a 2.0-liter 4-cylinder turbo charged petrol engine giving 191 hp hp/28 kgm (2.0 L) and 171 hp hp/27.1 kgm (1.8 L). It also has Think+ and Eagle View features for night-vision and 360 degrees vision. The starting price is around $23,000.

References

External links
 Luxgen Dominican Republic
 Luxgen S5 Official Taiwanese Website

S5
Cars introduced in 2011
2011 establishments in Taiwan
Front-wheel-drive vehicles
Compact cars
Sedans